King George Boulevard (formerly known as King George Highway) is a major arterial road in Surrey, British Columbia, Canada. The majority of the route varies from four to six lanes, and some sections in the north run parallel to the Expo Line, which has two adjacent SkyTrain stations: Scott Road station in South Westminster, and King George station in the Surrey City Centre district.

History
Prior to completion of the Pattullo Bridge in 1937 and King George Highway in 1940, the main route from Vancouver and New Westminster to both the U.S. border and Fraser Valley was to take the New Westminster Bridge (also known as the Fraser River Swing Bridge) and Old Yale Road from New Westminster to Cloverdale, where travellers could either continue east along the Southern Trans Provincial Highway (present-day Fraser Highway) or south along the Pacific Highway. With the completion of the Pattullo Bridge in 1937 and the King George Highway in 1940, motorists were provided with a more efficient route between Vancouver and New Westminster and the U.S. border. Opened in 1940, the route was originally named "King George Highway" in honour of the royal visit of King George VI the previous year.  The corridor was designated Highway 99 and also carried Highway 1 north of present-day Fraser Highway, both of which continued northwest over the Pattullo Bridge and into Vancouver.

In 1973, the Highway 1 and 99 designations were moved to Highway 401 and 499 respectively, with their former alignments being renumbered Highway 1A and Highway 99A. Highway 1A and 99A were decommissioned in 2006 and the name was changed to "King George Boulevard" in 2009 "to project an image of a modern, safe, walkable and livable City Centre community", given that portions of the corridor have had a reputation for being dangerous and having a high incidence of criminal activity.

Route description
King George Boulevard begins at the Highway 99 / 8 Avenue interchange in South Surrey, just east of the City of White Rock and assumes a north-westward orientation, running adjacent to the larger highway and through the more urban neighbourhood of Sunnyside. It crosses over Highway 99 and passes through the more suburban and rural Panorama Ridge neighbourhood, before crossing Highway 10 and passing through the populous town centres of Newton and Whalley, including the Surrey City Centre, a neighbourhood within Whalley which is Surrey's commercial core and emerging regional downtown. Just north of Fraser Highway, King George Boulevard passes King George station, the eastern terminus of the SkyTrain's Expo Line. The SkyTrain runs parallel to King George Boulevard, passing Central City shopping mall and other commercial developments before turning west. It passes between the low-lying South Westminster and Bridgeview neighbourhoods, as well as Scott Road station, before ending at the south end of the Pattullo Bridge. The roadway enters New Westminster and becomes McBride Boulevard, ending at 10 Avenue at the New Westminster / Burnaby city boundary.

Major intersections

References

Former British Columbia provincial highways
Transport in Surrey, British Columbia